Pristimantis ridens, also known as the pygmy rain frog and the Rio San Juan robber frog, is a species of frog in the family Strabomantidae. It is found in western Colombia (Pacific slopes of the Cordillera Occidental), and then through Panama and Costa Rica to Nicaragua and eastern Honduras.

Description
The dorsal skin is smooth and pale brown or yellow in colour, with some pink undertones. There is often a slightly darker W-shaped patch just behind the head. Individuals may have a single or two, parallel dorsolateral stripes. The thighs are barred. The ventral colouration is yellow with some dark specks.

Pristimantis ridens can be very similar to Pristimantis cruentus.

Habitat and conservation
It also occurs disturbed habitats such as degraded secondary vegetation, plantations, rural gardens, and urban areas.

References

ridens
Amphibians of the Andes
Amphibians of Colombia
Amphibians of Costa Rica
Amphibians of Honduras
Amphibians of Nicaragua
Amphibians of Panama
Amphibians described in 1866
Taxonomy articles created by Polbot